Gol-e Behi (also Romanized as Gol-e Behī; also known as Gol) is a village in Behi-e Feyzolah Beygi Rural District, in the Central District of Bukan County, West Azerbaijan Province, Iran. At the 2006 census, its population was 255, in 48 families.

References 

Populated places in Bukan County